Ladek C. "Lud" Fiser (October 26, 1908 – August 25, 1990) was an American football and baseball player and coach. He served as the head football coach at Kansas State University in 1945, compiling a record of 1–7. Fiser was also the head baseball coach at Kansas State in 1947 and 1948, tallying a mark of 25–16.

Fiser was a native of Mahaska, Kansas, and a 1931 graduate of Kansas State University, where he was a two-year letterman on the football, baseball and track teams.

Prior to taking the head football coaching job at Kansas State, Fiser was head coach for seven seasons for the high school football team in Atchison, Kansas, and then at Manhattan High School from 1942 to 1944. Under his guidance, Manhattan High posted an undefeated (9–0) season in 1943.

Head coaching record

College football

References

Additional sources
 Fitzgerald, Tim. (2001) Wildcat Gridiron Guide: Past & Present Stories About K-State Football
 "Chamber dedicates facility to long-time exec"

External links
 

1908 births
1990 deaths
Kansas State Wildcats baseball coaches
Kansas State Wildcats baseball players
Kansas State Wildcats football coaches
Kansas State Wildcats football players
College men's track and field athletes in the United States
High school football coaches in Kansas
People from Washington County, Kansas
Coaches of American football from Kansas
Players of American football from Kansas
Baseball coaches from Kansas
Baseball players from Kansas
Track and field athletes from Kansas